"Bass Cannon" is a song by English dubstep producer and DJ Flux Pavilion. The song was released in the United Kingdom on 19 March 2011 for digital download. The single peaked at number 56 on the UK Singles Chart, number 9 on the UK Dance Chart and number 5 on the UK Indie Chart.

Track listings

Chart performance

Release history

References 

2011 singles
2011 songs
Flux Pavilion songs
Songs written by Flux Pavilion